Janne Grönvall (born July 17, 1973) is a retired professional Finnish ice hockey player.

He last played for Tappara in the Finnish SM-liiga. This was his third stint with the club. He first joined the club in 1992, when he left Lukko Rauma. In 1994, he left them for the AHL club St. John's Maple Leafs, which was the affiliate team of Toronto Maple Leafs who drafted Grönvall in the 1992 NHL Entry Draft. After two season in North America and zero games in the NHL Grönvall moved back home to Finland and Tappara. This time he stayed with Tappara until 2003 when he signed with Swedish Elite League team Färjestad BK. After two seasons and two runners-up medals in Sweden with Färjestad Grönvall decided once again to move back home and once again signed with Tappara. He eventually ended his career playing for Krefeld Pinguine in the German DEL league.

Grönvall represented Finland at the 2001 World Hockey Championship.

Career statistics

Regular season and playoffs

International

External links 

1973 births
Living people
People from Rauma, Finland
Finnish ice hockey defencemen
Färjestad BK players
St. John's Maple Leafs players
Toronto Maple Leafs draft picks
Sportspeople from Satakunta